Hoplostethus occidentalis, more commonly known as the Atlantic roughy or western roughy, is a member of the family Trachichthyidae. It has a wide distribution in the Atlantic Ocean ranging from as far south as Brazil all the way to southern Nova Scotia. It can reach lengths of up to  SL.

References

External links
 

occidentalis
Fish described in 1973
Fish of the Atlantic Ocean